Saint Quirinus is venerated as a martyr and saint of the Catholic Church. He died together with Saint Abidianus and Saint Papocinicus in Africa.

References 

Christian saints in unknown century
Year of birth unknown
Year of death unknown